Family Pirate Party (Okiraku Sugoroku Wii in Japan) is a pirate-themed party video game developed by Arc System Works for WiiWare. It was released in Japan on January 17, 2009, and later, released in North America on May 11, 2009 and the PAL region on July 30, 2010.

Gameplay 
Players control a member of a family, which includes a mother, father, son (Billy), and daughter (Sarah), as they traverse around a group of islands, competing against each other to collect the most gold pieces. In addition to picking up random Help Cards that allows them to gain more gold or steal pieces from other players, players may also encounter brief minigames that require them to use the Wii Remote to fight off an angry octopus or shoot down cannonballs or asteroids heading towards them.

The game features additional downloadable content in the form of new maps and a swimsuit costume for each character.

Reception

Family Pirate Party received negative reviews from critics upon release. On Metacritic, the game holds a score of 46/100 based on 4 reviews, indicating "generally unfavorable reviews." On GameRankings, the game holds a score of 36.83% based on 6 reviews.

IGN criticized the game's lack of interaction, noting that the gameplay largely equates to "nothing more than the random, repetitive rolling of dice" by the computer. Nintendo Life called it "a poor man's Mario Party". Both reviews criticized Family Pirate Party's few mini-games, which they felt should have been the focus of the game as in the Mario title.

References

External links 
Official Website (Japanese)

2009 video games
Arc System Works games
Multiplayer and single-player video games
Party video games
Video games about pirates
Video games developed in Japan
Wii games
Wii-only games
WiiWare games